The Nueva Ecija Rice Vanguards are a professional basketball team  based in Nueva Ecija, Philippines. It competes in the Maharlika Pilipinas Basketball League (MPBL), and formerly in the Filbasket under the name of Nueva Ecija Capitals, as well as the Chooks-to-Go Pilipinas 3x3.

History
In May 2019, the Nueva Ecija Rice Vanguards formally joined the Maharlika Pilipinas Basketball League (MPBL), becoming the first major professional basketball team based in the province since the Nueva Ecija Patriots of the now-defunct Metropolitan Basketball Association (MBA). During the middle part of 2019–20 MPBL season, the team tapped Charles Tiu as their head coach, replacing Alvin Grey.

In 2022, the Rice Vanguards won their first MPBL championship after winning the 2022 MPBL Finals against Zamboanga Family's Brand Sardines, 3–1.

Current roster

Head Coaches
 Eric Gascon (2019)
 Alvin Grey (2019)
 Charles Tiu (2019–2021)
 Carlo Tan (2021–2022)
 Jerson Cabiltes (2022–present)

MPBL records

References

2019 establishments in the Philippines
Basketball teams established in 2019
Maharlika Pilipinas Basketball League teams
Sports in Nueva Ecija